Maceió Urban Rail is the  metre gauge diesel commuter rail line that serves the city of Maceió, Alagoas, Brazil. The line connects Maceió with two cities in the metropolitan area, Satuba and Rio Largo (the line's northern terminus).

Background
The project has a fund of R$174 million to construct its railway line. The first stage of the project is working with eight cars in the passages Bebedouro/Central Station and Center/Mangabeira. It was later planned to expand operation to cover the route between Maceió and Lourenço Albuquerque.

References

External links
 CBTU Maceió – official webpage

Metre gauge railways in Brazil